Robin Hannibal Mølsted Braun is a Danish record producer and songwriter, best known for being one half of the musical duo Quadron and for being a founding member of Rhye, which he has since left. Besides being involved in both, he is also known for producing two tracks for Little Dragon's Nabuma Rubberband and received co-writing credits for Bitch, Don't Kill My Vibe by Kendrick Lamar, as the song contained a sample of "Tiden Flyver" performed by his band Boom Clap Bachelors.

As of 2019, he has been nominated four times for Grammy Awards.

Biography
Robin Hannibal is a four-time Grammy nominated producer and writer. He produced two tracks on the Grammy nominated Nabuma Rubberband album by Little Dragon, and was a co-writer on the two-time Grammy nominated album good kid, m.A.A.d city by Kendrick Lamar. He is also a co-writer on Lemon Pepper Freestyle by Drake ft. Rick Ross as well as the first track on Doja Cat's debut EP Purrr! . For the 2019 Grammy Awards, Robin has been nominated for the "Album of the Year" award for his contribution to the Black Panther Original Motion Picture Soundtrack. He co-produced and co-wrote "Bloody Waters". Robin has scored the upcoming film Surrounded set to release in 2022, starring Letitia Wright, Jamie Bell, Jeffrey Donovan, Brett Gelman, and Michael K. Williams.
Robin Hannibal is signed to Hipgnosis.

Discography

Awards and nominations
Danish Music Awards
2013 - Best Urban Act, Quadron
2013 - Best New Act, Quadron
2013 - Best Producer, Robin Hannibal

Danish Critics Choice Awards
2013 - Best Hit, "Hey Love" - Quadron
2013 - Best Producer, Robin Hannibal

Nordic Music Prize
2013 - Best Album, Rhye (nominated)

Polaris Music Prize
2013 - Best Album, Rhye (nominated)

Danish Electronic Awards
 Lifetime Achievement Award, Robin Hannibal

Danish National Radio P3 Awards
Best New Act, Quadron

References

Danish record producers
Danish songwriters
Living people
1981 births